The University of Medicine, Pharmacy, Science, and Technology of Târgu Mureș is a public university in Târgu Mureș, Romania, founded in 1945. Classified as a research and education university by the Ministry of Education, it is one of the 6 traditional medical schools in Romania beside Bucharest, Cluj-Napoca, Craiova, Iași and Timișoara, all being founded before the 1989 Romanian revolution. The university is named after the prominent scientist George Emil Palade.

History 
Medical education in Târgu Mureș (also spelled as Tîrgu Mureș) began in 1945 as a branch of the Faculty of Medicine of the Bolyai University of Cluj. After the foundation of this university, the Faculties of Philology, Philosophy, Law, Economics and Natural Sciences started their activity in Cluj, and the Faculty of Medicine was moved to Târgu Mureș, where it operated between 1945 and 1948.

In 1948, after the Education Reform, the Medical and Pharmaceutical Institute of Târgu Mureș was founded, an independent higher education institution with the following faculties: Medicine, Paediatrics, Hygiene, Dentistry and Pharmacy. Between 1951 and 1958 it comprised three faculties: General Medicine, Paediatrics and Pharmacy. In 1958-1959 the Faculty of Paediatrics was transformed into a department; and from 1960-1961 the department of Dentistry started operating again, becoming a faculty in the academic year 1965-1966.

By Decree 800/ 1965 and by the Order of the Minister of Education, the Institute of Medicine and Pharmacy of Târgu Mureș gained the right to award doctoral degrees in medicine (7 professors were appointed as doctoral supervisors). The Faculty of Pharmacy ceased its activity between 1986 and 1990. In 1991, the Institute was given the name of University of Medicine and Pharmacy of Târgu Mureș (UMF Târgu Mureș/MOGyE).

In September 2018, the University of Medicine and Pharmacy absorbed the Petru Maior University, and became the University of Medicine, Pharmacy, Science, and Technology of Târgu Mureș.

Faculties 
The University carries on its activity as a university with a structure and specialities that are accredited by the law. The University of Medicine and Pharmacy of Târgu Mureș functions as a public institution with legal status, being the only university in the field of healthcare where teaching is in Romanian, Hungarian, and recently, in English. Graduates of study programmes can benefit from different levels of academic degrees: bachelor, master’s, doctoral. Their area of specialisation according to the division of academic knowledge and professional division of labour is also different. Following the absorption of Petru Maior University, three more faculties were integrated into the university.

 Faculty of Medicine (six-year curriculum. Languages of instruction: Romanian, Hungarian and English)
 Faculty of Pharmacy (five-year curriculum. Languages of instruction: Romanian and Hungarian)
 Faculty of Dentistry (six-year curriculum. Languages of instruction: Romanian, Hungarian and English)
 Faculty of Engineering (Romanian)
 Faculty of Sciences and Letters (Romanian, English and French)
 Faculty of Economics and Law (Romanian and English)

Alumni 
 András Grépály, doctor, professor of the university and tubercologist
 Ferenc Pál Gyergyay, doctor, professor of the university and oncologist
 Adrian Lobontiu, medical doctor, surgeon of the university
 Ernő András Lőrincz, professor of the university
 Dezső Miskolczy, neurologist, constitutor of the university, professor in Târgu Mureş between 1945-1960
 László Nemes, chemist and professor

International Locations 
In September 2019, UMFST opened its first medical faculty in Hamburg-Bahrenfeld, Germany the form of University Targu Mures Medical Campus Hamburg (UMCH). Since 2019 a 6-year study program of human medicine has been offered on the campus in Hamburg, leading to an approbable degree. Since UMCH is a branch of a state-run Romanian university, admission is independent of school grades – contrary to other German universities. Theoretical lessons on the Hamburg campus are held in English. For the practical part from the 3rd academic year onwards, students go to one of UMCH’s teaching hospitals in Germany. Bedside-teaching is held in German. Optionally the study can also be finished in Romania. In this case the study language at the hospital bed is English.

References

External links

 
Official website of UMCH

Universities in Târgu Mureș
Medical schools in Romania
1948 establishments in Romania
Universities and colleges formed by merger in Romania
Educational institutions established in 1948